Luis Ignatius Peñalver y Cárdenas (3 April 1749 – 17 July 1810) was a Cuban Catholic Bishop of New Orleans, and Archbishop of Guatemala.

Biography
He was born in Havana, the son of a wealthy and noble family. After studying belles-lettres and philosophy in St. Ignatius College, Havana, he followed there the courses of the University of St. Jerome and in 1771 obtained the degree of Doctor of Theology. His bishop entrusted to him several missions of an administrative nature, and in 1773 appointed him provisor and vicar-general.

When Pope Pius VI, at the request of Charles IV of Spain, created Louisiana and the Floridas a diocese, distinct from the diocese of Santiago de Cuba, Luis Penalver was made its first bishop. He made his entrance into New Orleans on 17 July 1795, took formal possession of his see, and in the following December published an "Instrucción para el govierno de los párrocos de la diócesis de la Luisiana". He soon began the visitation of his diocese, which then extended over the country known later as the Louisiana Purchase Territory.

On 21 April 1796, he was at Iberville, on 8 November of the same year at Natchitoches, and at Pensacola on 7 May 1798. Upon his return in 1799, he drew up a report in which he complained of the ignorance, irreligion, and the want of discipline which then prevailed in Louisiana.

Bishop Peñalver was promoted to the Archiepiscopal See of Guatemala on 20 July 1801, and by a Rescript from Rome was empowered to transfer his authority in Louisiana and the Floridas to Canon Thomas Hasset, his vicar-general, and to Rev. Patrick Walsh. After a chase by an English war-vessel, Archbishop Peñalver arrived at Guatemala.

At his own expense he built a hospital and various schools.  He resigned his see on 1 March 1806, and, returning to Havana, devoted the last years of his life to charitable works. At his death he bequeathed $200,000 to the poor and several important legacies to educational institutions. Archbishop Blenk writes of him that he was "a man of great talents, zeal, and piety, whose administration was marked by an uncommon degree of wisdom and a strict attachment to the discipline of the Church." He died in Havana, aged 61.

References

Sources
 John Dawson Gilmary Shea, History of the Catholic Church in the U.S., 1763-1815 (New York, 1888)
 (for Chronology of Bishops)
 (for Chronology of Bishops)

1749 births
1810 deaths
18th-century Cuban Roman Catholic priests
Roman Catholic Archdiocese of New Orleans
Roman Catholic bishops in Louisiana
19th-century Roman Catholic bishops in Guatemala
18th-century Roman Catholic bishops in Guatemala
Roman Catholic archbishops of Guatemala (1743-2013)